The Euliini are a tribe of tortrix moths.

Distribution
Most Euliini (nearly 98%) are found in the Neotropics and a small number is found in the Nearctic. Only Eulia is found in the Old World, since it has a Holarctic distribution.

Diversity
The tribe includes over 650 described species in nearly 90 genera. Most species have been described in recent years.

Taxonomic history
The tribe was first proposed as Euliae by Kuznetsov and Stekolnikov (1977) as a subtribe of Cochylini. Powell elevated the group to tribal status in 1986. Research by Regier et al. in 2012 has provided fairly convincing evidence that Cochylini are a monophyletic lineage within a broader Euliini. If this is accepted, Cochylini should be treated as subtribe Cochylina of Euliini.

Biology
The larvae of most species are leaf-rollers or leaf-folders. However, some may be gall-inducers or leaf litter-feeders.

Genera

Unplaced species
Phtheochroa inexacta Butler, 1883
Sericoris cauquenensis Butler, 1883

Former genera
Mexiculia
Paraneulia
Pseudargyrotoza

References

 , 2003: Three new genera, two new species, and some rectifications in neotropical Euliini (Lepidoptera: Tortricidae). Proceedings of the Entomological Society of Washington 105: 630-640
 , 2005: World Catalogue of Insects volume 5 Tortricidae.
 , 2013: A new genus of pine-feeding Cochylina from the western United States and northern Mexico (Lepidoptera: Tortricidae: Euliini). Zootoxa 03640 (2): 270–283. Abstract: 
 , 1997: Euliini (Lepidoptera: Tortricidae) of Peru with descriptions of new taxa and list of the New World genera. Acta Zoologica Cracoviensia 40: 79–105.
 , 2000: Revision of the New World Euliini - genus Bonagota Razowski, with notes on Apotomops Powell & Obraztsov (Lepidoptera: Tortricidae). Polish Journal of Entomology 69 (1): 65–76.
 , 2000: Seven new Neotropical genera of Euliini (Lepidoptera: Tortricidae) and their species. Polish Journal of Entomology 69 (3): 335–346. 
  2010: Tortricidae from Chile (Lepidoptera: Tortricidae). Shilap Revista de Lepidopterologia 38 (149): 5-55.
 , 2009: Tortricidae (Lepidoptera) from the mountains of Ecuador and remarks on their geographical distribution. Part IV. Eastern Cordillera. Acta Zoologica Cracoviensia 51B (1-2): 119–187. . Full article:  .
 , 2010: Tortricidae (Lepidoptera) from Peru. Acta Zoologica Cracoviensia 53B (1-2): 73–159. . Full article:  .

 
Moth tribes